Edwina von Gal is an American landscape designer based in East Hampton, New York. Her firm, Edwina von Gal + Co founded in 1984, is based in East Hampton, NY and focuses on natural, sustainable designs.  She has worked with numerous architects, designers and art world luminaries, among them Maya Lin, Annabelle Selldorf, Richard Gluckman, Richard Meier, Larry Gagosian, Cindy Sherman, David Maupin, Stefano Tonchi, Calvin Klein, and Richard Serra. She designed the park for Panama's Biomuseo, with Frank Gehry. Her approach emphasizes sustainability, natural landscapes, and the use of native species.

In 2008 she founded the Azuero Earth Project in Panama to promote chemical free reforestation with native trees on the Azuero Peninsula.

In 2013 she founded the Perfect Earth Project to promote chemical-free, non-agricultural land management in the US, and is its current president.

Her husband Jay Chiat, died in 2002.  She has a daughter, Ariel Sheldon, and a grandson, Dylan.

Affiliations:
 Founding member and past president of Metro Hort Group 
 Member of the Board "What is Missing?", Maya Lin's environmental media artwork
 Member, Advisory Council, Philip Johnson Glass House

Awards
 Quill and Trowel Award for Garden Writing, 1998
 Institute of Classical Architecture and Art's Arthur Ross Award, 2012
 Decoration and Design Building Stars of Design Award, Landscape Design, 2013 
 Guild Hall Lifetime Achievement In the Visual Arts, 2017
 NY School of Interior Design Green Design Award, 2018
 Isamu Noguchi Award, 2018
 Quogue Wildlife Refuge Conservator Award, 2020

Bibliography
 Fresh Cuts   Workman Publishing, 1997
 The Perfect Yard Handbook, 2016

Articles
 Vogue "A Glorious Riot" Dec 2014
 Architectural Digest"Going Greener" May 2016
 The New York Times Magazine "Zen Rock Garden" Sept 4, 2005 in Design 
 Cultured "A Landscape Designer Paints Minimalist Pictures in Plants" Fall, 2015

References

External links
The Azuero Project official website
The Perfect Earth Project official website

Living people
American landscape architects
New Classical architecture
Year of birth missing (living people)